Vengurla is a town in Sindhudurg district of Maharashtra, India just north of Goa. It is surrounded by a semicircular range of hills with lush green foliage mainly of cashew, mango, coconut, and different kinds of berry trees. The hills of Dabholi, Tulas, and Mochemad respectively lie in the north, the east, and the south of Vengurla, while the Arabian Sea is located on its west.

The town has a rich cultural heritage. Vengurla Taluka has some temples including those of Devi Sateri, Shri Rameshwar, Shri Navadurga at Kanyale Redi, Shri Mauli at Redi and Shiroda, Shri Vetoba at Aaravali, Shri Rampurush Temple at Kanyale Redi, Shri Ganesh at Redi and Shri Ravalnath.

History
Vengurla, being a safe and natural port, commercial centre was initially established during 1665 by Dutch traders and subsequently by British rulers. Signs of Dutch - British rulers are present in the city : Dutch Wakhar (Warehouse), St. Lukes Hospital, Crowferd Market, etc. Planned city having road, market, commercial and office buildings, Municipal Council, Hospitals, Parks, etc. was developed by British rulers. The 130-year-old Vengurla Municipal Council is one of the oldest Municipal Council in Maharashtra State.

Geography
It has an average elevation of .Vengurla is also known as Vingoria. Areas included are Dabholi, Khanoli, Vetore, Tendoli, Wayangani, Surangpani,Shiroda,Redi.

Climate

Under the Köppen climate classification, Vengurla features a tropical monsoon climate The record high temperature was 42 °C which was recorded in the month of April while the record low temperature was 10 °C which was recorded in the month of December.

Demographics
According to India's 2001 census, Vengurla had a population of 12,471 in 2001. Males and females constituted 49% and 51%, respectively, of the population. 81% of Vengurla's population was literate (86% of males and 76% of females) compared to 59.5% of India's total population. 10% of the town's population was under 6 years of age at the time of the census.

Language 
Malvani is spoken as a local language (Malvani Konkani). Marathi, being the state language, is also understood and implemented.

Places of interest
 Dev Vethobha Temple, Aarvali
 Shirodha Beach for Water Sports
 Mochemad Beach
 Dutch Fortified Factory (1637)
 Velaghar
 Kepadevi Temple,Ubhadanda
 Asoli
 Lighthouse
 Terekhol Beach
 Mansishwar Temple, Bagayatwadi
 Kalvi beach, kelus
 Redi
 Vengurla jetty
 Sagareshwar Beach
 Dabholi beach
 Ubhadanda beach
 Wayangani beach
 Bagayatwadi beach
 Muth beach
 Mansishvar Temple
 Dabhoswada, Vengurla Bandar Road
Navghar Beach
 Vetore Sateri temple, ravalnath 
   temple

Image gallery

References

External links

  Vengurla:Waman Parulekar - information about Vengurla
 Navadurga at Redi Vengurla - information about famous Navadurga Temple at Redi, Vengurla

Cities and towns in Sindhudurg district
Talukas in Maharashtra